Arcadia Plantation, originally known as Prospect Hill Plantation, is a historic plantation house located near Georgetown, Georgetown County, South Carolina. The main portion of the house was built about 1794, as a two-story clapboard structure set upon a raised brick basement in the late-Georgian style. In 1906 Captain Isaac Edward Emerson, the "Bromo-Seltzer King" from Baltimore, purchased the property. Two flanking wings were added in the early 20th century. A series of terraced gardens extend from the front of the house toward the Waccamaw River. Also on the property is a large two-story guest house (c. 1910), tennis courts, a bowling alley, stables, five tenant houses and a frame church. The property also contains two cemeteries and other plantation-related outbuildings.

It was listed on the National Register of Historic Places in 1978.

References

External links

Plantation houses in South Carolina
Houses in Georgetown County, South Carolina
Houses completed in 1794
Houses on the National Register of Historic Places in South Carolina
National Register of Historic Places in Georgetown County, South Carolina
Historic American Buildings Survey in South Carolina
Georgian architecture in South Carolina
1794 establishments in South Carolina